Bawal ang Pasaway kay Mareng Winnie (international title: Offenders, Beware to Mareng Winnie / ) is a Philippine television public affairs program broadcast by GMA News TV. Hosted by Solita "Winnie" Monsod, it premiered on March 2, 2011. The show concluded on March 17, 2020. It was replaced by Bright Side in its timeslot.

Overview
Bawal ang Pasaway was conceived of as a public affairs program to better explain societal issues to the Filipino public, along with what can be done about them, with host Solita Monsod stating that "Everybody’s talking about corruption. Nobody is saying what’s behind it and what can be done. And that’s essentially what the public affairs program will be." In 2015, Monsod admitted that she never heard of the term "pasaway" before the program's creators suggested it to her. A few of the program's interviewees included Imelda Marcos, Cristina Ponce-Enrile, and Ronald dela Rosa.

Production
The production was halted in March 2020 due to the enhanced community quarantine in Luzon caused by the COVID-19 pandemic.

Accolades

References

External links
 
 

2011 Philippine television series debuts
2020 Philippine television series endings
Filipino-language television shows
GMA Integrated News and Public Affairs shows
GMA News TV original programming
Philippine television shows
Television productions suspended due to the COVID-19 pandemic